Leona Edmiston is an Australian fashion designer based in Sydney. She studied fashion design at East Sydney Technical College and began her first label, called "Morrissey Edmiston", with fellow Australian designer Peter Morrissey in 1983. The label was popular for over 14 years. In 1996, the label split and Edmiston started her solo label, Leona Edmiston with her husband, Jeremy Ducker, in 2001.

Edmiston showed at Mercedes Australian Fashion Week in 2004, 2005, and 2006; while in 2008 and 2009 she conducted private showings off the Fashion Week schedule. Leona Edmiston has stores in Australia (including Myer), US and the UK as well as online.

References

External links
Leona Edmiston fashion label website

Living people
Australian fashion designers
Australian women fashion designers
Australian women company founders
Australian company founders
Year of birth missing (living people)